A usurper is a person who makes an illegitimate or controversial claim to power.

Usurp, usurper, or usurpation may also refer to:

Literature

Conan the Usurper, a 1967 collection of fantasy stories
 Usurper!, a Way of the Tiger gamebook
Usurpers, novel by Francisco Ayala

Other
 , a Royal Navy Second World War submarine
Usurp Synapse, a screamo band from Indiana
Usurpation of Qi by Tian, a series of events between 481 and 379 BCE during which the Tian clan overthrew the Jiang clan in the ancient Chinese state of Qi
Nest usurpation, when the queen of one species of eusocial insects takes over the colony of another species

See also
List of usurpers
List of Roman usurpers